Sumpinghayu is a village at district Dayeuhluhur, Cilacap Regency, Central Java.

Geographic
The landscape of Sumpinghayu is mountains and dense forest.
Two major rivers flow through this village. Those rivers are the Cidayeuh and Citengah.

References

Cilacap Regency
Dayeuhluhur